Kepler-63 is a G-type main-sequence star about 638 light-years away. Kepler-63 is similar to the Sun in its concentration of heavy elements.

The star is exhibiting strong starspot activity, with relatively cold (4700 K) starspots concentrated in two mid-latitude bands similar to the Sun, changing their position in a cycle with a period of 1.27 years. Due to high magnetic activity associated with its young age, Kepler-63 has a very hot corona heated to 8 million degrees, and produces over ten times the solar amount of x-rays than the Sun.

Multiplicity surveys did not detect any stellar companions to Kepler-63 by 2016.

Planetary system
In 2013 a transiting hot Jupiter planet b was detected on a tight orbit. The orbit is nearly polar to the equatorial plane of the star.

References

Cygnus (constellation)
G-type main-sequence stars
Planetary systems with one confirmed planet
Planetary transit variables
J19165428+4932535
0063